The 2009 Tulane Green Wave football team represented Tulane University in the 2009 NCAA Division I FBS football season. It was the Green Wave's third year under head coach Bob Toledo. The Green Wave finished the season 3–9 and 1–7 in CUSA play.

Offseason
January 10: Bob Toledo announced the hiring of Steve Stanard as the defensive coordinator for the Green Wave. Stanard is 42 and brings 18 years of defensive experience. Prior to Tulane, Stanard spent 14 years as a defensive coordinator at Colorado State, New Mexico State, South Dakota and Nebraska Wesleyan. His teams have participated in nine bowl games. He inherited a Green Wave defensive unit that returned 21 letterwinners, including six starters for the 2009 season.
March 19: Defensive end Reggie Scott was granted a sixth year of eligibility by the NCAA as a result of a medical hardship. Scott is a 6-4, 260-pound defensive end from Charlotte, N.C., and is a three-year letterwinner and two-year starter. He earned honorable mention All C-USA merits for the second straight year last season. Scott was a starter for 11 games and registered 31 tackles (25 solo), including 6.5 stops for lost yardage (35), and two sacks. He recorded his first career interception vs. #14 East Carolina, finished with a season-high six stops (5 unassisted) at Tulsa and recorded quarterback sacks vs. #14 East Carolina and SMU.
April 24: Former Tulane star and current NFL running back Matt Forte was selected as a recipient of the 2009 Brian Piccolo Award. The Award was presented at Halas Hall in Chicago.

Preseason
The Green Wave came off a 2–10 season in 2008.

Schedule

Roster

References

Tulane
Tulane Green Wave football seasons
Tulane Green Wave football